Macx Davies (born December 24, 1992) is a Canadian biathlete. He was born in Calgary, Alberta. He has competed in the Biathlon World Cup, and represented Canada at the Biathlon World Championships 2016.

Career

2018 Winter Olympics
In January 2018, Davies was named to Canada's 2018 Olympic team.

References

1992 births
Living people
Canadian male biathletes
Skiers from Calgary
Biathletes at the 2018 Winter Olympics
Olympic biathletes of Canada